is a Japanese manga artist, illustrator, animator and doujinshi artist. He has designed characters for manga, anime and video games, and has frequently collaborated with director Kazuki Akane, including on his most famous work, The Vision of Escaflowne. After working at Artland and D.A.S.T. (Ichirō Itano's animation studio, which he ran after becoming independent from Artland), he is currently working as a freelancer.

Career
Yūki graduated from Saitama Prefectural Toda Shoyo High School and has been active in the school's "Manga and Anime Research Interest Club" (now Manga and Anime Research Club). He found business in the National Health Insurance but couldn't give up on being an animator, so he left and became an animator instead. He is good friends with Mamoru Nagano, Maria Kawamura and Fumio Iida (SUEZEN), and they used to go to Tokyo Disneyland on Christmas Eve, which is also Yūki's birthday.

The published doujinshi include key animation from his body of work and specially drawn manga. On the other hand, since he worked on Ralphilia Saga by Akara Arisato (Dengeki Bunko), he has been involved in several works as a guest member of the doujin circle La Moon.

Yūki has also attended several international animation festivals as a guest of honor, including Anime Expo, Animazement, and Otakon.

Works

Anime series
 Bionic Six (character designer)
 Heat Guy J (character designer, animation director)
 Kids on the Slope (character designer, assistant animation director, ep. 12)
 Maken-ki! (character designer)
 Orange (character designer)
 Paradise Kiss (character designer, chief animation director)
 Space Battleship Yamato 2199 (character designer)
 Space Pirate Captain Herlock: The Endless Odyssey (character designer, animation director)
 Toward the Terra (character designer)
 The Vision of Escaflowne (character designer)
 Under Ninja (character designer)
 Xenosaga: The Animation (character designer)

Movies
Escaflowne (character designer, animation director)
The Five Star Stories (character designer, animation director)
The Weathering Continent (character designer)
X (character designer, animation director)

OVA
Angel Cop (character designer)
Battle Angel Alita (character designer)
Battle Royal High School (character designer, animation director, key animator)
Cleopatra DC (character designer, animation director)
Clover (character designer, animation director)
Record of Lodoss War (character designer, animation director)
Sukeban Deka (character designer)

Video games
 Azure Dreams (promotional artwork, Japanese cover)
 Blade Arts: Tasogare no Miyako R'lyeh (character designer)
 Chrono Cross (character designer)
 Dragon Force II (character designer)
 Kaiser Knuckle (known outside Japan as Global Champion; image illustrator)
 Ragnarok Online Opening Movie (character designer, animation director)
 Seiken Densetsu 3 (character designer)
 Solatorobo: Red the Hunter (character designer)
 Tail Concerto (character designer)
 Trinity Trigger (world designer)

Written works

Manga
Vaelber Saga (1990-2003)

Art books
1999 a WORK of CLOVER
Anvil Rough-Drawings
Anvil II Rough-Drawings
Anvil III Rough-Drawing Works
Chrono Cross - Missing Piece
Escaflowne Fan Book (for the feature film)
Escaflowne Fan Book (for the TV series)
The Five Star Stories
Heat Guy J
Heat Guy J Rough-Drawing Works
Heat Guy J Second II
Phantasien
The revise pictures of XX
Seikendensetsu III Illustration Book
Senshi Bankō: Phantasien II
Solatorobo LITTLE TAIL BRONX ARCHIVES VOL 1–3
Toward the Terra Pilot Film
Xenosaga: The Animation—Character Design

References

External links
 Nobuteru Yūki's blog
 

1962 births
Anime character designers
Japanese animators
Living people
Manga artists from Tokyo
People from Tokyo
Sunrise (company) people